I'm Going Home is a 2001 French-Portuguese film written and directed by Manoel de Oliveira.

Plot
Gilbert Valence is a grand old theatre actor who receives the shocking news that his wife, daughter, and son-in-law have been killed in a car accident. As time passes, Valence busies himself with his daily life in Paris, turning down unsuitable roles in low-brow television productions and looking after his 9-year-old grandson. When an American filmmaker miscasts him in an ill-conceived adaptation of James Joyce's Ulysses, Valence finds himself compelled to make a decision about his life.

Cast
Michel Piccoli as Gilbert Valence
Catherine Deneuve as Marguerite
John Malkovich as John Crawford, Film Director
Antoine Chappey as George
Leonor Baldaque as Sylvia
Leonor Silveira as Marie
Ricardo Trêpa as Guard
Jean-Michel Arnold - Doctor
Adrien de Van as Ferdinand
Sylvie Testud as Ariel
Isabel Ruth as Milkmaid
Andrew Wale as Stephen
Robert Dauney as Haines
Jean Koeltgen as Serge
Mauricette Gourdon as Guilhermine, the Housekeeper

Reception
On review aggregator website Rotten Tomatoes, the film has a 96% approval rating based on 55 reviews, with an average rating of 7.78/10 and the consensus that it is "a masterfully subtle and poignant exploration of morality." It was one of the films in competition for the Palme d'Or in the 2001 Cannes Film Festival. It won the Critics Award for Best Film at the 2001 São Paulo International Film Festival and the Golden Anchor Award at the 2002 Haifa International Film Festival. It also won the Globo de Ouro for Best Film at the 2002 Globos de Ouro. Michel Piccoli was nominated for Best Actor at the 2001 European Film Awards.

Anthony Quinn of The Independent wrote, "Always good to see Michel Piccoli...in Manoel de Oliveira's I'm Going Home he plays Valence, a grand old stage actor who has recently lost his family...Few cameras stare so intently at things as de Oliveira's, and the long excerpts he films from Ionesco and The Tempest are frankly de trop, but this patient detailing of an actor's life...has a fascination akin to watching a sun slowly disappear beneath the horizon."

References

External links

2001 films
French comedy-drama films
Portuguese comedy-drama films
2000s English-language films
English-language French films
English-language Portuguese films
2000s French-language films
Films directed by Manoel de Oliveira
Films produced by Paulo Branco
Golden Globes (Portugal) winners
2001 comedy-drama films
2000s French films